Always on Sunday is a 1965 British television film directed by Ken Russell about Henri Rousseau. It was written by Russell and Melvyn Bragg for the Monitor series. Russell's first fully dramatised biopic, the narrator was Oliver Reed.

The part of Rousseau was played by painter James Lloyd who had never acted before. Russell said he would not have made the film had Lloyd not so closely resembled Rousseau. The director said: "Not only is there a strong physical resemblance but he and Rousseau are very much alike in character - strong and gentle."

Reception
The Guardian said it was made with "remarkable imaginative pungency".

References

External links
Always on Sunday at IMDb
Always on Sunday at BFI Screenonline
Always on Sunday at Letterbox DVD
 Always on Sunday at Diabolique

1965 television films
British television films
1960s biographical films
1965 films
Films directed by Ken Russell